The Weltstadthaus ("global city building"), housing a department store in Cologne, Germany, was designed by Renzo Piano and completed in 2005, following a lengthy legal battle concerning the structural engineering of the core building. It covers up a main traffic artery, the Nord-Süd-Fahrt, and faces Europe's most frequented shopping mile, the Schildergasse.

Overview
With its usual, organic shape reminiscent of a ship, but also of a stranded whale -- Kölners have dubbed it the Walfisch--it provides 14.400 m² floor space, on a length of 130 m and a width of 60 m. The atrium offers a view of five stories with a height of 36 m. The 4900 m² glass façade is constructed from 6800 individual panes and 66 massive  laminated beams of Siberian larch. The northern façade consists of 4.400 m² of natural stone.

Wedged between a late Gothic church, the Antoniterkirche, and nondescript post-war concrete, it consists of two distinct parts.  A rectangular block of stone takes up the rhythms of the surrounding seventies' angular forms, while the partially encircling wood-and-glass construction flows toward the church that had looked somewhat displaced previously. 

Municipal regulations prevent the cupola from being accessible to the general public, but it is opened on special occasions. The department store is operated by the German chain Peek & Cloppenburg, who commissioned the Piano design, which has won several prizes. 

From P&C's point of view, this is one in a series of Weltstadthäuser, each designed by a different architect:  in 
Berlin (Gottfried Böhm), 
Düsseldorf (Richard Meier), 
Frankfurt (RKW Rhode Kellermann Wawrowsky), 
Cologne (Renzo Piano), 
Leipzig (Moore Ruble Yudell), 
Mannheim (Richard Meier again), 
Stuttgart (Josef Paul Kleihues),
Vienna (David Chipperfield, completed late 2011).

References

External links

Weltstadhaus Köln page on the P & C website (in German)
 Information on the facade structure on the website of the structural engineering firm Knippers Helbig
 Photos of the Weltstadthaus on Flickr

 

Buildings and structures in Cologne
High-tech architecture
Renzo Piano buildings
Innenstadt, Cologne
Landmarks in Cologne